Heliophanoides spermathecalis is a jumping spider species in the genus Heliophanoides that lives in India. The female was first described in 1992.

References

Spiders described in 1992
Salticidae
Spiders of the Indian subcontinent